Vasyl Ishchak (born 5 April 1955 in Dubie) is a retired Ukrainian professional footballer and manager.

Playing career 
Ishchak began his career with SC Lutsk. After playing in reserve matches for SKA Lviv he signed with FC Mashuk-KMV Pyatigorsk in the Soviet Second League. In 1977, he signed with FC Chornomorets Odesa in the Soviet Top League. During his tenure with Odessa he played in 4 games in the UEFA Cup 1990–91. He also won a USSR Federation Cup. In 1990, he went to Hungary to play with BVSC Budapest FC, and with FC Blaho Blahoyeve. In 1994, he went overseas to Canada to sign with Toronto Italia in the Canadian National Soccer League.

Managerial career 
After his retirement from competitive football he coached the youth teams of Chornomorets Odesa. In 2015, he was appointed head coach to Toronto Atomic FC in the Canadian Soccer League. He was awarded with the CSL Coach of the Year in 2015. In 2016, Toronto Atomic extended his contract. In 2018, he managed Unionville Milliken SC in League1 Ontario.

Personal life 
Ishchak is married to Odessa-born ballerina Tatiana Stepanova.

Honours
 USSR Federation Cup winner: 1990.

References 

1955 births
Living people
Soviet footballers
Soviet expatriate footballers
Ukrainian footballers
Ukrainian expatriate footballers
Expatriate footballers in Hungary
Expatriate soccer players in Canada
Soviet Top League players
FC Chornomorets Odesa players
Budapesti VSC footballers
Toronto Italia players
Ukrainian football managers
Canadian National Soccer League players
Canadian Soccer League (1998–present) managers
Association football forwards
Soviet expatriate sportspeople in Hungary
Ukrainian expatriate sportspeople in Hungary
Ukrainian expatriate sportspeople in Canada
Association football defenders
FC Mashuk-KMV Pyatigorsk players
K. D. Ushinsky South Ukrainian National Pedagogical University alumni
Sportspeople from Lviv Oblast